Plutonium(III) chloride is a chemical compound with the formula PuCl3. This ionic plutonium salt can be prepared by reacting the metal with hydrochloric acid.

Structure 
Plutonium atoms in crystalline PuCl3 are 9 coordinate, and the structure is tricapped trigonal prismatic. It crystallizes as the trihydrate, and forms lavender-blue solutions in water.

Safety 

As with all plutonium compounds, it is subject to control under the Nuclear Non-Proliferation Treaty.  Due to the radioactivity of plutonium, all of its compounds, PuCl3 included, are warm to the touch. Such contact is not recommended, since touching the material may result in serious injury.

References 

Plutonium(III) compounds
Nuclear materials
Chlorides
Actinide halides